The Parliament of Rhodesia was the bicameral legislature in Rhodesia from 1970 to 1979. 
Several elections were held, last in 1977.

Senate
The upper chamber was called the Senate, and it had 23 members: ten White Rhodesians, ten African chiefs, and three persons appointed by the President of Rhodesia. The President of the Senate was the presiding officer. The Senate had only delaying powers for legislation.

House of Assembly
The lower chamber was called the House of Assembly, and it had popularly elected 66 members, organised in Westminster style. 50 of the members were non-Africans and 16 of the members were African. The parliamentary term was five years. The Speaker of the House was the presiding officer.

See also
Rhodesia
List of legislatures by country

References

Parliament
Defunct bicameral legislatures
Defunct national legislatures
1970 establishments in Rhodesia
1979 disestablishments in Rhodesia